The Pakistan Bureau of Statistics (abbreviated as PBS) is a  federal agency under the Government of Pakistan commissioned the national statistical services and to provide solid and comprehensive statistical research. Results compiled and produced by the Pakistan Bureau of Statistics helps to better understand Pakistan, its population, resources, economy, society, and culture. PBS is an attached departments of the M/O Planning Development & Special Initiatives.

History
In 1947, the Central Statistical Office (CSO) was set up by the government of Prime Minister Liaquat Ali Khan. In 1950, CSO became an attached department of the Economic Affairs Division. In 1972, on the recommendation of IBRD Mission, Prime Minister Zulfikar Ali Bhutto upgraded the Central Statistical Office to a full-fledged government division. In 1981, the bureau was reorganized and its technical wing (CSO) was converted into the then Federal Bureau of Statistics. Former Finance Minister Dr. Mahbub ul Haq further reorganized the bureau.

See also
Government of Pakistan
Politics of Pakistan
Statistics

References

External links
Federal Bureau of Statistics

Pakistan federal departments and agencies
Pakistan
1950 establishments in Pakistan
Government agencies established in 1950